Liberty's Prisoners: Carceral Culture in Early America is a history book by Jen Manion, a professor of History and Sexuality, Women's and Gender Studies at Amherst College, published in 2015 by the University of Pennsylvania Press. The book was awarded the 2016 Mary Kelley Book Prize by the Society for Historians of the Early American Republic.

Synopsis
Manion reviews historical material from Pennsylvania between 1792 and 1835, including court and prison records as well as other historical material, to examine changes in the penal system during this era and disparities based on race, gender, poverty, and sexuality.

Reception
In a review for The American Historical Review, Jennifer Graber writes that Manion "draws on foundational work by Michel Foucault, David Rothman, and Michael Meranze, as well as more recent studies focused on women's and African Americans' experiences of prison. One of the book's strengths is its engagement with other critical historiographies about the period, including works on gender, race, violence, poverty, sex and sexuality, humanitarianism and sensibility, and labor and economy." Sharon Block writes in a review for the Journal of Women's History, "A dexterous scholar, Manion takes a theoretically-influenced empirical approach to tracing the development of the carceral state in post-Revolutionary Pennsylvania. An average of nearly two hundred footnotes per chapter and an appendix of fourteen tables make clear this commitment to evidentiary documentation of lives too often erased." 

In a review for Early American Literature, Richard Bell describes the book as "a welcome complement to Rothman and Meranze," further stating, "It is vastly more attuned to the ways in which language conflates and categorizes human identity and experience, and easily surpasses those earlier studies in its attention to the ways that the women and men confined at the center of Philadelphia's new carceral institutions attempted to contest, compromise, and transform the violent and divisive penal policies imposed upon them from above," and that Manion "is to be commended for using a vast array of prison records and vagrancy dockets to draw sustained attention to an urban underclass of hucksters, arsonists, sex workers, and beggars too poor or too transient to show up in surviving tax lists, censuses, or church records."  In a review for The William and Mary Quarterly, Michael Meranze writes, "Liberty's Prisoners powerfully recaptures the moment of transition between an older penal system based on public pain and shame and an emergent one centered on confinement, surveillance, and hidden humiliation", and states Manion "implicitly criticizes my work for inadequately engaging with both the question of sexuality and the perspectives of Walnut Street's early inmates. Although I appreciate [Manion's] refusal to engage in polemics for their own sake, had [Manion] staged this criticism more explicitly and discussed the extent to which these issues might alter or extend my own (or others') analysis, I think it would have made [Manion's] book a more powerful intervention." 

Ashley Rubin writes in a review for Journal of the Early Republic, "In a way, Liberty's Prisoners is less about punishment than gender, class, and race; prisons are irrelevant to the narrative — they could be any instrument of power." Adam Jay Hirsch writes in a review for The Historian, "even if this book is not definitive, its pioneering stabs at neglected aspects of the sociology of incarceration make Liberty's Prisoners worth looking at." In a review for The Journal of American History, Gwenda Morgan writes, "By focusing on the punishment meted out to selected groups — immigrants, African Americans, and  the poor — Manion moves discussions of change away from an earlier emphasis on felony and the death penalty to misdemeanors such  as vagrancy and petty theft. The focus on small-scale offenders is new, and the extraordinary punishments to which they were subjected cries out for explanation." Ittai Orr writes in a review for American Quarterly that Manion focuses "on particular prison populations—African Americans, the poor, women, sexual deviants — but Manion is careful to highlight the intersectionality of many of these prisoners: interracial sex was even more queer than sodomy, and although the Irish endured as much discrimination, poverty, and imprisonment as black people, their punishments were never as harsh — especially as the nineteenth century wore on — as those of black women. It is this motley capaciousness — Manion's interest in tying questions of gender and sexuality to those of race — that distinguishes [Manion's] work on early prisons and reformers and makes Liberty's Prisoners an important addition to the field."

In Reviews in American History, Jeannine Marie DeLombard writes, "Too often Manion's rich archival evidence leads to critical conclusions that have already been elaborated by non-historian scholars of early American penality. [...] Even so, [...] Liberty's  Prisoners provides the historical long view that is too often  missing from the ongoing controversy over race and penality in America." Paul Kahan writes in a review for The Pennsylvania Magazine of History and Biography, "That the story Manion tells has been ably told before in no way diminishes Liberty's Prisoners; it is an important, if not essential, work on the history of American penitentiaries." In a review for the Register of the Kentucky Historical Society, Charlene J. Fletcher-Brown writes, "Manion's analysis of court and prison records is perhaps the work's greatest strength. These sources not only provide insight into prison management and policymaking, but also ways in which inmates resisted within incarcerated spaces and, more important, demonstrates the humanity of incarcerated people."

References

External links 
  (author website)

2015 non-fiction books
Books about social history
History books about punishment
Non-fiction books about racism 
Non-fiction books about sexuality
Books about women
Books about African-American history
Non-fiction books about American slavery
Books about LGBT history
Books about legal history
Books about United States legal history
History books about the 18th century
History books about the 19th century
University of Pennsylvania Press books